Lorenzo Vasco (born 19 June 1997) is an Italian professional football midfielder who plays for Serie D club A.S. Ostia Mare Lido Calcio. Typically deployed in a more defensive-midfield role, he states that his role model is Yaya Touré.

Early career
Vasco was born in Aprilia, Lazio, Italy, and began his career in the youth teams of local side F.C. Aprilia, before he signed for Serie A giants Roma. He eventually made his way into the Primavera side, making over fifty appearances in the Campionato Nazionale Primavera and UEFA Youth League, and winning the former with Roma in the 2015-16 season. He was also the captain of the Primavera side during this triumph, and scored a vital penalty in the shoot-out against Juventus Primavera at the Mapei Stadium in Reggio-Emilia.

Loans
Vasco made a loan move in 2016, joining Lega Pro side Südtirol on an initial one-year loan. After making few appearances, Roma recalled the young midfielder early, in January 2017, and subsequently sent him out on another loan, this time to Fidelis Andria. He made his debut for the Leoni Azzurri on 22 January 2017, starting in central midfield and playing 58 minutes of a 1-1 draw with Catanzaro.

References

External links

1997 births
Living people
Italian footballers
Association football midfielders
Serie C players
Serie D players
A.S. Roma players
F.C. Südtirol players
S.S. Fidelis Andria 1928 players
S.S. Racing Club Fondi players